Asian Television Network (ATN) is a publicly traded Canadian broadcasting company, with 54 television channels in 9 languages, serving the South Asian cultural communities in Canada. ATN operates a South Asian Radio service on XM, available in Canada and the United States.  Headquartered in Markham, Ontario, the company has been in operation since 1997, and is headed by Indo-Canadian broadcaster Shan Chandrasekar.

Awards and recognition

 2011 TSX Venture 50 
 2009 Newmarket Chamber of Commerce Large Business of the Year 
 2008 Jaya Chandrasekar inducted into Canadian Broadcast Hall of Fame 
 2004 Shan Chandrasekar inducted into Canadian Broadcast Hall of Fame

Television
ATN currently owns and operates 46 Canadian television channels and has licences for several others. In addition, ATN is a major distributor of cricket programming in Canada,  as it possesses the Canadian broadcasting rights for many of the top cricket events in the world. 

 ATN Aastha TV (Hindi/Gujarati)
 ATN ABP Sanjha (Punjabi)
 ATN Aapka Colors (Hindi)
 ATN ARY Digital (Urdu)
 ATN B4U Movies (Hindi)
 ATN B4U Music (Hindi)
 ATN B4U Plus (Hindi)
 ATN Bangla (Bengali)
 ATN Brit Asia TV (Hindi/Punjabi)
 ATN Channel (Hindi, other South Asian languages)
 ATN Colors Bangla (Bengali)
 ATN Colors Marathi (Marathi)
 ATN Colors Rishtey (Hindi)
 ATN Cricket Plus (Sports channel- English)
 ATN DD Bharati (Culture- Hindi)
 ATN DD India (Hindi)
 ATN DD News (Hindi)
 ATN DD Sports (English)
 ATN DD Urdu (Urdu)
 ATN Food Food (Lifestyle channel- Hindi)
 ATN Gujarati (Gujarati)
 ATN IBC Tamil
 ATN Jaya TV (Tamil) 
 ATN Life (Hindi)
 ATN Max 2 (Hindi)
 ATN Movies (Hindi)
 ATN MTV India (Hindi)
 ATN News (English)
 ATN News18 India (English)
 ATN PM One (Punjabi)
 ATN Punjabi (Punjabi)
 ATN Punjabi 5 (Punjabi)
 ATN Punjabi News (Punjabi)
 ATN Punjabi Plus (Punjabi)
 ATN SAB TV (Hindi)
 ATN Sikh Channel (Punjabi)
 ATN Sony Aath (Bengali)
 ATN Sony Max (Hindi)
 ATN Sony Mix (Hindi)
 ATN Sony TV (Hindi)
 ATN SVBC (Telugu)
 ATN Tamil Plus (Tamil)
 ATN Times Now (English)
 ATN Urdu (Urdu) 
 ATN Zoom (Hindi)
 Commonwealth Broadcasting Network (English)

Foreign Services
In addition to the 46 O&O channels that it has launched itself, Asian Television Network also distributes a number of foreign services in Canada.  ATN is the official Canadian distributor for the following channels:

 ABP News (India)
 ARY Musik (Pakistan)
 ARY News (Pakistan)
 ARY Qtv (Pakistan)
 ARY Zauq (Pakistan)
 Channel i (Bangladesh)
 NDTV Good Times (India)

Radio

On October 27, 2007, ATN launched a 24hr South Asian satellite radio station on the XM Satellite Radio platform. It features news, sports & entertainment programming broadcast primarily in Hindi & Punjabi, among other regional languages.

See also
 List of broadcasting licences held by Asian Television Network

References

External links 
 Asian Television Network
 ATN-Asian Radio
 CRTC chart of ATN's assets

Asian-Canadian culture in Ontario
Companies listed on the TSX Venture Exchange
Television broadcasting companies of Canada
Companies based in Markham, Ontario